1st Canadian Infantry Battalion may refer to:

Unit of the First World War:
 1st Battalion, CEF

Units of the Canadian Army Pacific Force in 1945:
 1st Canadian Infantry Battalion (The Royal Canadian Regiment), 1st Canadian Infantry Regiment
 1st Canadian Infantry Battalion (Princess Patricia's Canadian Light Infantry), 2nd Canadian Infantry Regiment
 1st Canadian Infantry Battalion (Royal 22e Régiment), 3rd Canadian Infantry Regiment

Unit of the Korean War:

 1st Canadian Infantry Battalion, created in 1951 and in 1953 became 3rd Battalion, The Canadian Guards